Rye Water may refer to:
 River Rye (Ireland) (also Rye Water, Ryewater), tributary joining the River Liffey at Leixlip
 Rye Water, tributary of the River Garnock, Scotland
 Rye Water, racehorse, winner of the Yorkshire Oaks in 1928

See also
 River Rye (disambiguation)